Somkuan Seehapant (born 10 February 1946) is a former Thai cyclist. He competed in the individual road race at the 1968 Summer Olympics.

References

External links
 

1946 births
Living people
Somkuan Seehapant
Somkuan Seehapant
Cyclists at the 1968 Summer Olympics
Somkuan Seehapant
Asian Games medalists in cycling
Cyclists at the 1966 Asian Games
Medalists at the 1966 Asian Games
Somkuan Seehapant
Somkuan Seehapant